"You and I" is a song by German rock band Scorpions from their thirteenth studio album Pure Instinct. It was released as the first single from the album, and was a top 40 hit in at least five countries, including their native Germany where it peaked at No. 22. A "Butcher" radio remix of this song was included as a Japan-only bonus track on the band's 1999 album Eye II Eye.

Music video
The music video was directed by Marcus Nispel. It premiered in May 1996 and was filmed in Manhattan.

Charts

References

1996 songs
1996 singles
Scorpions (band) songs
Rock ballads
Songs written by Klaus Meine
East West Records singles